Osage Bluff is an unincorporated community in Cole County, in the U.S. state of Missouri.

History
A post office called Osage Bluff was established in 1858, and remained in operation until 1912. The community was named from the bluffs along the Osage River.

References

Unincorporated communities in Cole County, Missouri
Unincorporated communities in Missouri
Jefferson City metropolitan area